"Cowboys from Hell" is a song by American heavy metal band Pantera. First appearing on the band's 1989 demo album, the song is the band's first single.  It was released later on the major label debut album Cowboys from Hell, and on the band's compilation album.

Pantera used the phrase "Cowboys from Hell" (or its abbreviation, CFH) liberally in its image and merchandise.

Production
Pantera's vocalist Phil Anselmo recalled on an episode of That Metal Show that during a 1989 house party in Fort Worth, Texas, guitarist Dimebag Darrell (Darrell Abbott) arrived late and ran towards Anselmo and said he had a new riff to show him. The two of them went into Abbott's car where he played the intro to Anselmo, who said afterward to Abbott, "Yes, this must be an anthem.".

Drummer Vinnie Paul described the concept:

Bassist Rex Brown remembered the designing of the introduction:

The song was recorded for the band's 1989 demo album, Cowboys from Hell: The Demos. After the band got signed to Atco Records, the band rerecorded the song and put it on the major label debut album Cowboys from Hell. It was written in the key of E major.

Reception
"Cowboys from Hell" is the band's first single off their major label debut album of the same name. The song ranked #25 on VH1's 40 Greatest Metal Songs.

Guitar World considered "Cowboys from Hell" to be the best Pantera song, writing: "Dimebag Darrell's delicious solo boldly announced that a new guitar hero was in town and loaded for bear".

Metal Hammer ranked the song #3 on its list of the 50 best Pantera songs.

Music video
The music videos for this song and for "Psycho Holiday" were recorded in a Dallas club that the band frequented called "The Basement" and were directed by Paul Rachman. The video simply shows the band playing the song live to an audience.

References

1990 songs
Atlantic Records singles
1990 debut singles
Pantera songs
Song recordings produced by Terry Date
Songs written by Dimebag Darrell
Songs written by Vinnie Paul
Songs written by Phil Anselmo
Songs written by Rex Brown